Roberto Heuchayer Santos de Araújo (born 4 December 1990), simply known as Roberto, is a Brazilian footballer who plays for Vitória as a left back.

Club career
Roberto was born in Picos, Piauí. A Bahia youth graduate, he made his professional debut on 30 May 2009, coming on as a second-half substitute for Ávine in a 0–0 away draw against Portuguesa.

Roberto scored his first professional goals seven days later, netting a double in a 4–0 home routing of ABC. Released by the club in 2011, he subsequently represented Bahia de Feira, Campinense, Fluminense de Feira, Feirense and Icasa before signing for Atlético Paranaense on 14 December 2013; he was, however, immediately loaned to Ferroviária.

On 21 May 2014 Roberto was loaned to Náutico, until the end of the year. On 15 May 2015, after another spell at Ferroviária, he joined Bragantino, still owned by Atlético.

On 25 August 2015 Roberto returned to Furacão. He made his Série A debut on 17 September, starting in a 1–2 home loss against Grêmio.

Honours
Bahia de Feira
Campeonato Baiano: 2011

Ferroviária
Campeonato Paulista Série A2: 2015

References

External links
Atlético Paranaense profile 

1990 births
Living people
Sportspeople from Piauí
Brazilian footballers
Association football defenders
Campeonato Brasileiro Série A players
Campeonato Brasileiro Série B players
Campeonato Brasileiro Série C players
Esporte Clube Bahia players
Campinense Clube players
Fluminense de Feira Futebol Clube players
Associação Desportiva Recreativa e Cultural Icasa players
Club Athletico Paranaense players
Associação Ferroviária de Esportes players
Clube Náutico Capibaribe players
Clube Atlético Bragantino players
Santa Cruz Futebol Clube players
Associação Chapecoense de Futebol players
Londrina Esporte Clube players
Figueirense FC players